Alankar Television, commonly known as Alankar TV, is a 24-hour Odia jatra channel from the house of Odisha Television Network. It is the first jatra genre-specific channel in Odisha. The channel is aimed at entertaining Odias across the globe who enjoy content from their own land. 

Odisha Television Network owns four more Odia channels namely OTV, Prarthana, Tarang Music and Tarang.

See also
List of Odia-language television channels
List of television stations in India

References

External links

Odisha Television Network
Television stations in Bhubaneswar
Odia-language television channels
Companies based in Bhubaneswar
Movie channels in India
Year of establishment missing
Television channels and stations established in 2015